"Autumn of My Life" is a song written and sung by Bobby Goldsboro, which he released in 1968. The song spent 9 weeks on the Billboard Hot 100 chart, peaking at No. 19, while reaching No. 2 on Billboards Easy Listening chart, No. 12 on Record Worlds "100 Top Pops", No. 1 on Record Worlds "Top Non-Rock" chart, No. 11 on Canada's RPM 100, No. 2 on RPMs Country Chart, and No. 18 on Australia's Go-Set National Top 40.

Chart performance

References 

1968 songs
1968 singles
Bobby Goldsboro songs
United Artists Records singles
Songs written by Bobby Goldsboro
Song recordings produced by Bob Montgomery (songwriter)
Songs about old age